Karizmeh (also Romanized as Kārīzmeh; also known as Kārīsmā and Kārīs Meh) is a village in Sang Bast Rural District, in the Central District of Fariman County, Razavi Khorasan Province, Iran. At the 2006 census, its population was 361, with 97 families.

References 

Populated places in Fariman County